Hopewell Township is one of the 25 townships of Licking County, Ohio, United States. As of the 2010 census the population was 1,381, up from 1,200 at the 2000 census. In 2010, 1,248 of the residents lived in the unincorporated portions of the township.

Geography
Located on the eastern edge of the county, it borders the following townships:
Hanover Township - north
Licking Township, Muskingum County - northeast corner
Hopewell Township, Muskingum County - east
Bowling Green Township - south
Franklin Township - west
Madison Township - northwest corner

Part of the village of Gratiot is located in southeastern Hopewell Township.

Name and history
It is one of five Hopewell Townships statewide.

Government
The township is governed by a three-member board of trustees, who are elected in November of odd-numbered years to a four-year term beginning on the following January 1. Two are elected in the year after the presidential election and one is elected in the year before it. There is also an elected township fiscal officer, who serves a four-year term beginning on April 1 of the year after the election, which is held in November of the year before the presidential election. Vacancies in the fiscal officership or on the board of trustees are filled by the remaining trustees.

References

External links
County website

Townships in Licking County, Ohio
Townships in Ohio